Michiko Tomabechi (born 29 January 1980) is a Japanese curler.

Career
Tomabechi competed at the 2014 Winter Olympics in Sochi, with the Japanese team.

In 2013, she was part of the bronze-winning team at the Pacific-Asia Championship in Shanghai.

Her husband, Kenji Tomabechi is also a competitive curler, they had become the national champion four times in mixed doubles,
and they have played four times in the World Mixed Doubles Curling Championship as Japan representatives.

References

External links

1980 births
Living people
Curlers at the 2014 Winter Olympics
Japanese curling champions
Japanese female curlers
Olympic curlers of Japan
20th-century Japanese women
21st-century Japanese women